Khalid Amin (Arabic: خالد أمين; born 15 February 1966) is a Moroccan writer, academic and researcher. He is a professor of Higher Education at the Faculty of Arts and Human Sciences in Tetouan, belonging to Abdelmalek Essaâdi University. He specialized in English literature, theater, Performance and cultural studies. He is the founder and president of the International Center for Performance Studies in Tangier and a member of the advisory board of the International Institute for the Interweaving of Performance Cultures at the University of Berlin. He was born in Tetouan on February 15, 1966, and settled in Tangiers. He wrote dozens of works and studies in both English and Arabic languages that mainly approached different types of Performance arts and sought to establish a kind of double criticism residing within the interstitial spaces. His work also integrates with the voices of post-colonial studies and those which underminine the colonial situation (Decoloniality).

His path 
After obtaining his bachelor's degree from Zainab Al-Nafzweyya High School in Tangiers, he studied at the English Language Department at the Faculty of Arts and Humanities in Tétouan. As soon as he obtained his bachelor's degree, Khalid Amin traveled to England to obtain a master’s degree from the University of Essex. He said about that experience and its cognitive and personal horizons, "Since I set foot in the University of Essex in Britain in 1990 with to complete my postgraduate studies, I was asked by Roger Howard, the head of the theater department at that prestigious university, "What about Moroccan theater?", then I realized that it was my duty to work on the self within the limits of its relationship with the other. The beginning  was from Shakespeare in the Moroccan theater, accompanied by my professors, Dr. Hasan Al-Munai’i and Muhammad Al-Amiri”. As soon as he obtained his master's degree from the University of Essex in modern literature – specializing in theater, he returned to Morocco and worked as a professor of higher education since 1993. Khalid Amin was keen to study the arts of Moroccan and Arab Performance and to introduce it to the whole world, based on the idea that a Performance is a human practice and is not confined to a specific culture. In 2000, he discussed his doctoral thesis in comparative literature in which he studied "Shakespeare in Moroccan Theater" under the joint supervision of England and Morocco.

Khalid Amin founded the International Center for Performance Studies, which was initially linked to the “Research Group in Theater and Drama” at the Faculty of Arts in Tetouan. Then he made it an independent institution cooperating with the faculty in the framework of an advanced and productive partnership. Later, he made many partnerships with Moroccan and international research and Performance centers, including the University of London and the "International Research Center for the Interweaving of Performance Cultures" belonging to the University of Berlin, which was founded by the pioneering German theater studies Erica Fisher Lichte.

Scientific and academic responsibilities 

 President of the International Center for Performance Studies (Tangiers - Morocco) since 2007.
 A member in the Scientific Committee of the International Institute for the Interweaving of Performance Cultures belonging to the University of Berlin, Germany (2010 – 2021)
 A member of the Executive Office of the International Federation for Theatrical Research (FIRT) (2010 – 2018).
 A member in the Moroccan Writers Union.
 Coordinator of the Research Group in Theater and Drama belonging to Abdelmalek Al-Saadi University (1998 – 2021).
 Director of the Tangier Festival for Performance Arts in Tangier and the Annual International Symposium of the Research Group in Theater and Drama belonging to the University of Abdelmalek Saadi (2007 – 2021).
 A member in the advisory board of Marks magazine.
 A member in the Scientific Committee of the Artistic Life Journal.
 A member in dozens of national and state doctoral examination and discussion committees, specializing in novels, theater, and communication sciences at different universities.
 A member of the National Committee for Theater Support headed by the Minister of Culture from 2002 to 2004.
 A visiting professor and collaborator with a group of research units and postgraduate studies programs in Morocco, America and Germany.  
 A member in the Reading Committee for the Moroccan Writers Union Award in 2002 and 2013.
 A member in the jury of the National Theater Festival in Meknes in 2003.

Works

individual works 

 What is after Brecht (Arabic title: Ma ba'd Byrshat), Al-Sindi Publications, Meknes, 1996.
 Moroccan Theater Between East and West-in English (Arabic title: Almasrah Al-Magribi Bain Manshoorat Al-Sinde), Book Club Publications, Faculty of Arts, Tetouan, 2000.
 Theatrical art and the Myth of Origin (Arabic title: Al-Fan Al-Masrahe wa is'toraat Al-Asil), publications of the Faculty of Arts, Tetouan, 2002, publications of the International Center for Performance Studies.
 Spaces of Silence (Arabic title: Masahat Al-samit) - The Seduction of Al-Mabaineyya in Our Theatrical Imaginary - Publications of the Moroccan Writers Union, Rabat, 2004.
 Theater and Performance Studies (Arabic: Al-Masrah wa Dirasat Al-Farjah), Publications of the International Center for the Studies of Performance, 2012.
 Theater and Fugitive Identities (Arabic title: Al-Masrah wa Al-Hiwayat Al-Hariba), Publications of the International Center for the Studies of Performance, 2019.
 Dancing on the Hyphen, publications of the Faculty of Arts and Human Sciences in Tetouan, 2020.

Translated works 
Erica Fisher Lichte, From the Theater of Acculturation to the Interweaving of Performance Cultures, the Publications of the International Center for Performance Studies, 2015

Patrice Bavis, Dramaturgy and Beyond Dramaturgy, co-translated with Said Karimi, Publications of the International Center for the Performance Studies, 2014

Common Works 

 The Theater and its Bets (Arabic title: Al-Masrah Wa Rihanati'h), Khaled Amin and Hassan Al-Manai'i, Publications of the International Center for the Performance Studies, 2012.
 Post-Drama Theatre (Arabic title: Masrah Ma Baed Al-Drama), Kristel Weiler, Hassan Al-Manai, Khaled Amin and Mohamed Seif, Publications of the International Center for the Performance Studies, 2012.
 Theaters of Morocco, Algeria, and Tunisia: Traditions of Phrasing in the Big Maghreb, Khaled Amin and Marvin Carlson, Palgrave Macmillan: London/New York, 2012.
 Dramaturgy: From Theatrical Work to the Spectator, Mohamed Seif / Khaled Amin, Tangiers, Publications of the International Center for Performance Studies, 2014.

Edited Books 

 Interfacing between Theatre and Anthropology, Publications of the Research Group in Theatre and Drama belonging to Abdul Malik Al-Saadi University, 2002.
 Improvised Discourse in Theatre, Discourse and Components, Publications of the Research Group in Theater and Drama belonging to  Abdelmalek El-Saadi University, Tetouan, 2003.
 Moroccan Theater between Theorizing and Professionalism, publications of the Research Group in Theater and Drama belonging to Abdelmalek Saadi University, Tetouan, 2004.
 Margins of Theories and Theories of Margins, Conference Proceedings, Abdelmalek Essaadi University, Faculty of Humanities, Tetouan 2003.
 Writing Tangier, Conference Proceedings, Abdelmalek Essaadi University, Tetouan 2005.
 Voices of Tangier, Conference Proceedings, Abdelmalek Essadi University, Tetouan 2006.
 Performance and Cultural Diversity, Publications of the International Center for Performance Studies, 2010
 Theater and Media, Publications of the International Center for Performance Studies, 2013
 Performance Transformations / Transformations  of Performance, Publications of the International Center for Performance Studies, 2013.
 A Performance and the Public Sphere, Publications of the International Center for Performance Studies, 2014.

References 

Moroccan writers
Arab scholars
Living people
1966 births
Academic staff of Abdelmalek Essaâdi University